Constantin Ritzmann (born December 20, 1979) is a German-born player of American football.

Early years
He was born in Freiburg, Germany. He moved from Berlin, Germany to Tallahassee, Florida in hopes of achieving success in American football. As a high school senior he was offered a scholarship from multiple D1 football powerhouses, including the University of Florida, Florida State, Alabama, Tennessee, Ohio State and many more.

He ended up choosing Tennessee over Florida State in 1998.

College career
At Tennessee, he played as a true freshman. He became a starter midway through his junior season and a team captain as a senior in 2003. He led the Tennessee Volunteers to an upset victory over then number 4 Miami which ended the nation's longest home winning streak.

Professional career
Constantin was signed by the Buffalo Bills in 2004 as an undrafted defensive end. He made the opening day roster. He was the first German-born non-kicker to appear on an NFL opening day roster.

During the 2005 season he was activated by the Atlanta Falcons and played in the loss to the Tampa Bay Buccaneers. His playing time in this game made him the second European non-kicking player (after Norwegian Leif Olve Dolonen Larsen) to actually see playing time during the regular season.

He finished his football career in 2007 with the Berlin Thunder of the NFL Europa.

References
https://web.archive.org/web/20110711101516/http://www.globalfootball.com/events/GJC07/GJChistory10years.pdf
http://www.tsn.ca/nfl/teams/players/bio/?id=7025&hubname=nfl

External links
 Tennessee Volunteers bio

1979 births
Living people
Sportspeople from Freiburg im Breisgau
German players of American football
Tennessee Volunteers football players
Atlanta Falcons players
Buffalo Bills players